Petrorhagia is a small genus of annual and perennial plants of the family Caryophyllaceae, mostly native to the Mediterranean region. It is low-growing with wiry stems and narrow, grass-like leaves. The flowers are small, in clusters similar to members of the genus Dianthus, in pink, lilac, or white. Petrorhagia saxifraga is the tunic flower or coat flower, similar to baby's breath, but shorter, and used in rock gardens.

These plants are mainly native to Eurasia, but some species can be found nearly worldwide, having been introduced to other continents.

Species
, Kew's Plants of the World Online lists 28 accepted species of Petrorhagia:

References

External links

 Jepson Manual Treatment
 USDA Plants Profile: Petrorhagia in North America
 Flora of North America

Caryophyllaceae
Caryophyllaceae genera